The Yulungshan vole, Yulong Chinese vole, Yulongxuen Chinese vole, or Yulongxuen red-backed vole (Eothenomys proditor) is a species of rodent in the family Cricetidae, endemic to Jade Dragon Snow Mountain in the Sichuan–Yunnan border region of China.

References

Musser, G. G. and M. D. Carleton. 2005. Superfamily Muroidea. pp. 894–1531 in Mammal Species of the World a Taxonomic and Geographic Reference. D. E. Wilson and D. M. Reeder eds. Johns Hopkins University Press, Baltimore.

Eothenomys
Rodents of China
Endemic fauna of China
Mammals described in 1923
Taxa named by Martin Hinton
Taxonomy articles created by Polbot